is a passenger railway station in located in the town of Shirahama,  Nishimuro District, Wakayama Prefecture, Japan, operated by West Japan Railway Company (JR West).

Lines

Station layout
The station consists of one side platform and one island platform connected to the station building by a footbridge; however, one side of the island platform is not in use. The station is unattended.

Platforms

Adjacent stations

|-
!colspan=5|West Japan Railway Company (JR West)

History
With the privatization of the Japan National Railways (JNR) on April 1, 1987, the station came under the aegis of the West Japan Railway Company.

Passenger statistics
In fiscal 2019, the station was used by an average of 15 passengers daily (boarding passengers only).

Surrounding Area
The station is located in an isolated rural area on the coast of Shirahama, surrounded by forest, and is a considerable distance from the Tsubaki neighborhood and Tsubaki onsen areas.

See also
List of railway stations in Japan

References

External links

 Kii-Hiki Station (West Japan Railway) 

Railway stations in Wakayama Prefecture
Railway stations in Japan opened in 1935
Shirahama, Wakayama